Pierre Pasquier may refer to:
 Pierre Pasquier (businessman)
 Pierre Pasquier (colonial administrator)
 Pierre Pasquier (violist)